

Film
 Gang War (1928 film), an American film about gangsters 
 Gang War (1940 film), a Million Dollar Productions film
 Gang War, an alternative name for Paper Bullets, a 1941 American film
 Gang War (1958 film) a 1958 American film starring Charles Bronson
 Gang War a 1962 British film featuring David Davies
 Gang War (1971 film), a 1971 Italian comedy film
 Gang War in Milan, a 1973 film
 Gang War: Bangin' In Little Rock, a 1994 documentary film

Video games
 Gang Wars (video game), a 1989 video game
 Crime Life: Gang Wars, a 2005 video game
 Gang conflicts in the Grand Theft Auto series, normally as part of the storyline.

See also
Turf war (disambiguation)
:Category:Organized crime conflicts
Gangwar (social group), a community from India